One Flew South was an American country music group composed of Eddie Bush, Chris Roberts, and Royal Reed, all three of whom sing lead vocals and play acoustic guitar. The group's first recording was a song for the soundtrack to the 2006 Disney animated film The Fox and the Hound 2. In 2007, One Flew South signed to Decca Records, releasing their debut album Last of the Good Guys in May 2008. The album featured collaborations with Marcus Hummon and J.D. Souther, producing the single "My Kind of Beautiful" which charted on the Billboard Hot Country Songs charts.

Biography

After a solo career, Royal Reed, a native of El Paso, Texas, met Chris Roberts, a native of New Orleans in the late 1990s while both were starring in a production of the Broadway musical The Civil War, alongside singer Larry Gatlin in New York City. Gatlin, who had once fronted a trio which also included his two brothers (Larry Gatlin & The Gatlin Brothers) mentored Reed and Roberts suggesting they add a third member to complete their vocal-centric group. Initially, they could not find a suitable third member for the trio. Eventually, they befriended Marcus Hummon with whom they began to write songs. Through Hummon, the two discovered South Carolina native Eddie Bush who was added to the group in 2005. The three members discovered that they worked well together as a vocal trio, and they chose the name One Flew South. All three sing lead vocals on their songs.

One Flew South's first recording was the song "Friends for Life" which Hummon co-wrote; the trio recorded the song on the soundtrack to the 2006 film The Fox and the Hound 2. After the song was released, the trio began recording demo tapes while seeking a record deal. With Hummon's help they were signed to a recording contract with Decca Records in 2007, as well as a publishing contract with Sony/ATV Publishing. Their debut album, Last of the Good Guys was released on May 27, 2008, debuting at No. 67 on the Billboard Top Country Albums charts; Most of the album's songs were co-written by the group's three members along with Hummon and rock songwriter J.D. Souther. Hummon also produced the album in addition to playing guitar, piano, and mandolin on it. The album's lead-off single, "My Kind of Beautiful" was co-written by Andy Griggs, who previously recorded it on his 2005 album This I Gotta See. It went for radio adds on June 2 and debuted at No. 57 on the Billboard Hot Country Songs charts for the chart week of June 21, 2008 where it stayed for a week. For the week of August 16, 2008, the song re-entered the Hot Country Songs charts at No. 56.

Discography

Albums

Singles

Music videos

References

External links
Eddie Bush official website

Country music groups from Tennessee
Vocal trios
Decca Records artists
Musical groups from Nashville, Tennessee
Musical groups established in 2005
Musical groups disestablished in 2009